Franciscus Bernardus Jacobus Kuiper (July 7, 1907 – November 14, 2003) was a distinguished scholar in Indology, and "one of the last great Indologists of the past century ... His very innovative work covers virtually all the fields of Indo-Iranian and Indo-Aryan philology, linguistics, mythology and theater, as well as Indo-European, Dravidian, Munda and Pan-Indian linguistics".

Biography 
Kuiper was born in The Hague, studied Latin, Greek, Sanskrit, and Indo-European linguistics at Leiden University, and in 1934 completed his doctoral thesis on the nasal presents in Sanskrit and other Indo-European languages. After give years as a high school teacher of Latin and Greek at the lyceum of Batavia (Jakarta), Indonesia, in 1939 he was appointed Professor of Sanskrit at Leiden University.

Kuiper was a member of the Royal Netherlands Academy of Arts and Sciences between 1937 and 1939, when he resigned. He became a member again in 1948. He was a Knight in the Order of the Netherlands Lion. He died in Zeist and was buried in the Rijnhof cemetery at Leiiden.

References

1907 births
2003 deaths
Dutch Indologists
Linguists from the Netherlands
Linguists of Nihali
Writers from The Hague
Leiden University alumni
Academic staff of Leiden University
Members of the Royal Netherlands Academy of Arts and Sciences
20th-century linguists